Dataram (formerly Dataram Corporation) is a manufacturer of computer memory and software products headquartered in Princeton, New Jersey. Dataram Memory was founded in 1967. It provided core memory for many early Digital Equipment computer systems. Dataram products include memory and storage, and related technical products and services for desktops, laptops, workstations and servers. The company sells worldwide to OEMs, distributors, value-added resellers, embedded manufacturers, enterprise customers, and end users. Dataram provides compatible server memory for companies including HP, IBM, Sun Microsystems, Oracle, Dell, Cisco, Lenovo, Intel and AMD. The company's manufacturing facility is in Montgomeryville, Pennsylvania, United States, and has sales offices in the United States, Europe, China, and Japan.

History
Dataram was founded in 1967 as a manufacturer of computer memory for Digital Equipment Corporation (DEC), selling 16 KB core memory.

In 1968, Dataram completed its initial public offering, and began trading on the American Stock Exchange under the symbol DTM. 

In 1974, the company developed memory for Digital PDP-11.

In 1976 the company produced the first solid-state drive called BULK CORE for DEC and Data General computers.

In 1987, Dataram produced memory for Sun Microsystems and Apollo workstations.

In 1989, they produced memory for HP/Apollo systems.

In 1999, the company moved from the American Stock Exchange to NASDAQ, trading under the symbol DRAM. They earned the highest number of Intel Advanced Memory Module Qualifications that year.

In 2001, the company acquired Memory Card Technology assets, and again earned the highest number of Intel Advanced Memory Module Qualifications for the year.

In 2002, the company's DDR memory modules for the Intel market received validation from Advanced Validation Labs.

In 2008, the company signed a service and support agreement with IBM, on 9 October 2018 acquired Cenatek Inc., a privately owned company located in Morgan Hill, California, whose products were based on high-speed storage such as the Rocket Drive PCI-based solid state disk and Ramdisk. The company's research and development was located in Redding, California.

In 2017, Dataram was taken private upon acquisition by LTL Group after taking part in the 2016 reverse IPO of U.S. Gold Corp.

Awards
In the fall of 2009 Dataram's Chief Technologist won the Tech Awards Circle in the Technologist of the Year category.

In September 2011, Dataram was listed in the Top 100 Companies by The Star-Ledger.

Certifications and memberships
Dataram's manufacturing facility is ISO 9001 certified, and its Intel and major clone servers, desktops, RAID, and barebones notebooks have been CMTL certified. In 2001 Dataram was named #52 in the Fortune's 100 Fastest Growing Small Companies. The company is a member of the American Council for Technology (ACT), the Joint Electron Device Engineering Council (JEDEC), the Storage Networking Industry Association (SNIA), Technical Support Alliance Network (TSANet), and a VMware Technology Alliance Partner (TAP).

January 2010, Dataram reached their 12th year of participation in CMTL Test & Certification Programs, having the longest testing relationships of all participants.

References

External links
 

1967 establishments in New Jersey
Companies based in Princeton, New Jersey
Electronics companies established in 1967
Companies formerly listed on the Nasdaq
Computer memory companies
Computer storage companies
Electronics companies of the United States
Manufacturing companies based in New Jersey